Sixth is the ordinal form of the number six.

 The Sixth Amendment, to the U.S. Constitution
 A keg of beer, equal to 5 U.S. gallons or  barrel
 The fraction

Music
 Sixth interval (music)s:
 major sixth, a musical interval
 minor sixth, a musical interval
 diminished sixth, an interval produced by narrowing a minor sixth by a chromatic semitone
 augmented sixth, an interval produced by widening a major sixth by a chromatic semitone
 Sixth chord, two different kinds of chord
 Submediant, sixth degree of the diatonic scale
 Landini sixth, a type of cadence
 Sixth (interval)

See also
 
 
 The Sixth, a 1981 Soviet film directed by Samvel Gasparov
 The 6ths, a band created by Stephin Merritt
 LaSexta (lit. The Sixth), a Spanish television channel